Cazadero may refer to:

 Cazadero (volcano), a mountain in Argentina
 Cazadero, California, U.S.
 Cazadero, Oregon, U.S.
 Cazadero Dam, a dam in the U.S. state of Oregon

See also